Moore Dry Dock Company was a ship repair and shipbuilding company in Oakland, California.
In 1905, Robert S. Moore, his brother Joseph A. Moore, and John Thomas Scott purchased the National Iron Works located in the Hunter's Point section of  San Francisco, and founded a new company, the Moore & Scott Iron Works  Moore had previously been vice president of the Risdon Iron Works of San Francisco. Scott was nephew to Henry T. and Irving M. Scott, owners of the nearby Union Iron Works, where John had risen from apprentice to superintendent. Their new business was soon destroyed by fire resulting from the San Francisco earthquake.

In 1909, Moore and Scott decided to move across the Bay, and so purchased the W. A. Boole & Son Shipyard, located in Oakland at the foot of Adeline Street along the Oakland Estuary.

In 1917, Moore bought out Scott and changed the business name to Moore Shipbuilding Company. Henry T. Scott and John T. Scott tried to establish a rival business with the Pacific Coast Shipbuilding Company, an enterprise that eventually did not outlive the World War I shipbuilding boom.

In 1922, Moore Shipbuilding renamed to the Moore Dry Dock Company, operating primarily as a repair yard, amidst a severe lack of demand for new construction in the 1920s and early 1930s. Its shipbuilding capabilities were again promptly expanded for the World War II boom, providing over 100 ships for the U.S. Navy and merchant marine. Moore ranked 82nd among United States corporations in the value of World War II military production contracts. Shipbuilding ceased at war's end, but repair operations continued. The Moore Dry Dock Company finally closed in 1961.

The yard was notable for its employment of several thousand African Americans, in both skilled and unskilled positions, at a time when they confronted major job discrimination. The scarcity of available labor due to the war may have had something to do with it.

At the Rosie the Riveter/World War II Home Front National Historical Park an inscription honoring the wartime contributions made by the Bay Area Shipyards during World War II states that "Moore Dry Dock handled the difficult jobs of production, repair and conversion that slowed overall output in other yards."

In 1950, the Moore facility was the target of a union picket when sailors were having a dispute with a ship owner whose ship was in Moore's dry dock at the time. The court battle which ensued eventually led to the Moore Dry Dock Standards for Primary Picketing at a Secondary Site (Sailors' Union of the Pacific (Moore Dry Dock Co.), 92 NLRB 547, 27 LRRM 1108 (1950)).

Moore Dry Dock Company ceased operations in 1961. Its site at the foot of Adeline Street on the Oakland Estuary is now occupied by Schnitzer Steel Industries, a large scrap metal recycling concern, based in Portland, Oregon.

W. A. Boole & Son

18 May 1901, the Lahaina, the first ship built in Oakland, is launched from the yard of W. A. Boole & Son at the foot of Adeline street. Adeline street is at the easternmost part of the property that later makes up Moore.

June 1901, a 3000-ton marine railway built by H. I. Crandall & Son of Massachusetts becomes operational in the Boole shipyard.

26 March 1909, it is announced that Moore & Scott have acquired the Boole shipyard for ca. $500,000.

World War 1
For World War 1 Moore Shipbuilding Company built for the US Shipping Board a number of ships, including some that become Empire ships:

World War 2
For the US war effort, Moore Dry Dock Company built:
 Type C3-class cargo ships.
 82 of 328 type C2 United States Maritime Commission cargo designs C2-S-A1 and C2-S-B1. Some were converted to AP Troopships.
 Ashland-class dock landing ships, Dock landing ships a type of Amphibious warfare ship.
 Type R refrigerated cargo ships, also called Reefer ships, design R2-S-BV1.
 Seaplane derricks, design class YSD-11. A Crane Ship.
 2 of 7 Fulton-class submarine tenders.
 5 of 9 Chanticleer-class Submarine rescue ships.

World War 2 Ships

Shipbuilding in Oakland and Alameda

The area of the Port of Oakland was a major shipbuilding center of the Bay Area during the war peaks that started in 1916 and 1940 and ended in 1922 and 1946. Like for the rest of the country, shipbuilding either came to a complete halt for many of the yards or proceeded at a much reduced rate in the interwar years due to the saturation of the market and during a time of arms reduction treaties and economic austerity.

 Outer Harbor
 Union Construction Company (1918 — 1922) 
 Inner Harbor, north bank
 Moore Dry Dock Company (1910 — 1956) 
 Hanlon Dry Dock and Shipbuilding (1918 — 1921) 
 Cryer & Sons
 Inner Harbor, south bank
 United Engineering Co. (1941 — 1945) 
 later Todd Shipyards, San Francisco Division repair yard
 Alameda Works Shipyard (1916 — 1924, 1942 — 1945) 
 formerly United Engineering Works (1900 — 1916)
 Pacific Bridge Company 
 General Engineering & Dry Dock Company 
 Pacific Coast Engineering
 Stone Boat Yard

See also
 California during World War II#Ship building
 USSB reports

See also
 Emergency Shipbuilding program
 List of shipbuilders and shipyards
 California during World War II
 Maritime history of California

References

Bibliography
 Lane, Frederic C. Ships for Victory. Baltimore: The Johns Hopkins University Press, 2001. 
 Arroyo, Cuahutémoc (Faculty Mentor: Professor Leon F. Litwack). "Jim Crow" Shipyards: Black Labor and Race Relations in East Bay Shipyards During World War II. The Berkeley McNair Journal, The UC Berkeley McNair Scholars Program.  - downloaded from Jim Crow Museum of Racist Memorabilia at Ferris State University on 19 August 2007
 Veronico, Nicholas A. World War II Shipyards by the Bay. San Francisco: Arcadia Publishing, 2007. Ch. 5 Peninsula and East Bay Shipbuilding.   
World War II Shipbuilding in the San Francisco Bay Area. Excerpt from Bonnett, Wayne. Build Ships!: San Francisco Bay Wartime Shipbuilding Photographs, 1940-1945. Sausalito, Calif.:Windgate Press, 2000. .  Access from National Park Service website 20 August 2007.
Moore, James R. The Story of Moore Dry Dock Company: A Picture History.  Sausalito, Calif.:Windgate Press, 1994.  
Moore Dry Dock Company. Progress. Oakland, 1920

External links
 Moore Dry Dock Company from Shipbuilding under the United States Maritime Commission 1936 to 1950. Accessed 23 August 2007.
 List of ships built at Moore Dry Dock Company
 Photo: Oakland Estuary westward: Moore-Scott shipyard in foreground
 Oil painting entitled "Wartime" - a view of the Moore Shipyards painted by William A. Coulter in 1919. Accessed 1 March 2013.
 The Moore Shipbuilding Company, Pacific Marine Review, Volume 17 (1920), pp. 59–62. Accessed 1 March 2013.
 A guide to the Moore Dry Dock Company photographs, 1878-1933
 Moore Dry Dock Company Ships Plans, 1768-1962

Shipbuilding companies of California
Defunct shipbuilding companies of the United States
Manufacturing companies based in Oakland, California
History of Oakland, California
Defunct companies based in the San Francisco Bay Area
Manufacturing companies established in 1905
Manufacturing companies disestablished in 1961
1905 establishments in California
1961 disestablishments in California
Buildings and structures burned in the 1906 San Francisco earthquake
Defunct manufacturing companies based in California
Shipyards in California